Jörgen Sandström  (born 13 November 1971) is a Swedish musician. He provided vocals, bass and guitar for Grave on their first three albums and played with Entombed (Bass/Backing Vocals) 1995-2004. He is currently involved with bands such as Krux (Guitar), Vicious Art (Bass/Backing Vocals), The Project Hate MCMXCIX (Vocals) and Torture Division (Vocals/Bass). He also did guest vocals on Nasum's Helvete and on Death Breath's Stinking up the Night.

References

Swedish heavy metal musicians
Living people
1971 births
Death metal musicians
21st-century guitarists
Entombed (band) members
Krux members